The Samsung S5610/11 (also known as Samsung Primo/Utopia) was announced in September 2011 as part of a range of feature phones released by Samsung. It supports smile detection, records video in QVGA at 30fps. It also has FM recording and SNS integration. A slightly updated version was released in March 2014 as GT-S5611 model. Both run on single-core CPUs ranging from 460 to 469 MHz. The differences are that the S5610 uses NXP's processor and has 108 MB internal memory, while the S5611 uses Spreadtrum's processor and has 256 MB internal memory.
However, the S5611 lacks WAP 2.0 functionality and the usage of the camera LED as a torch.

There is also an Indian CDMA+GSM version marketed as Primo Duos, with the internal model number SCH-W279.

It has also gained additional popularity due to unlicensed and uncredited usage by James Bond in the film Spectre.

Specifications
2.4-inch TFT LCD
5-megapixel camera with LED flash and autofocus
Smile and Blink detection, with image stabilization 
Stereo FM radio with RDS and 3.5mm audio jack, possessing FM recording functionality
680 h 3G standby (S5610) vs 310 h 3G standby (S5611)
resolution of 240 x 320 pixels.
108 MB Internal memory (S5610) vs 256 MB Internal memory (S5611)

Software (firmware) differences
S5610:
Editing contacts: 50 characters for first and last name
No call recorder
SMS capacity up to 300 messages
Calendar capacity up to 1000 entries
Video call(Useful for S5610K variant which have CIF front camera)
Can change font size in software
Transition animations between the menus
No dark theme

S5611:
Editing contacts: 20 characters for first and last name
Call recorder
SMS capacity up to 1000 messages
Calendar capacity up to 500 entries
No video call (CIF front camera)
Cannot change font size in software
No transition animations between the menus
Dark theme

References

S5610